William Frederick Henry Rosenberg (1868–1957) was an English ornithologist and entomologist.

His first expedition was to Colombia in 1894 where he collected insects and birds. The bird collection was acquired by Adolphe Boucard. In 1896 he went to Ecuador and later returned  to Colombia collecting especially for Walter Rothschild. From 1898 until 1899 he employed collectors in South America who provided him with bird skins for Rothschild. Duplicates went to the British Museum, surplus specimens were sold to other collectors and museums . He started a  business as a natural history dealer in Tring in 1897 and in 1898 he moved the dealership to 57 Haverstock Hill, London. He sold  specimens from Africa as well as S. America. New species were described by Ernst Hartert.

Rosenberg was a Fellow of the Royal Entomological Society of London.

References
Horn et al., 1990 Collectiones entomologicae. Berlin.
Mearns B. & Mearns  R., 1998 The Bird Collectors. Academic Press, London
Sharpe R.B., 1906 Birds. In Günther  A. (ed.), 1904–1912. The History of the Collections contained in the Natural History Departments of the British Museum, vol. 2. British Museum publication, London.

External links
Zobodat

English entomologists
English ornithologists
1868 births
1957 deaths